Fabio Leimer (born 17 April 1989) is a former professional racing driver from Switzerland. He is best known for winning the 2013 GP2 Series.

Career

Karting
Like many of today's racing drivers, Rothrist-born Leimer started his career in karting back in 2003, when he won the Swiss Junior Championship. He finished runner-up in the same category the following season before finishing second in the Swiss Championship ICA in 2006.

Formula BMW
In 2006, Leimer graduated to single-seater racing, competing in the Formula BMW ADAC series in Germany. He started the year with Team Rosberg, but finished the season with a different team, Matson Motorsport. During the year, he accumulated four points to be classified eighteenth in the standings. He also competed in the end-of-season Formula BMW World Final, held in Valencia, where he finished in nineteenth place.

Formula Renault
The following year, Leimer moved up to Formula Renault, racing in both the Eurocup Formula Renault 2.0 and Italian Formula Renault 2.0 championships for Jenzer Motorsport.

In the Eurocup series, he scored points in three races and took a single fastest lap at Donington Park to end the year in seventeenth place.

In the Italian championship, Leimer scored points in eleven of the fourteen races and took two podium places (at Spa-Francorchamps and Valencia) to be classified eleventh in the standings.

International Formula Master
In 2008, Leimer progressed to the International Formula Master series, once again racing with Jenzer Motorsport. In a very successful debut season, he finished as runner-up to champion Chris van der Drift, taking three race wins at Estoril, Imola and Monza along with five other podium places. He also helped Jenzer Motorsport finish third in the teams' standings. In the accompanying Formula Master Italia series, Leimer finished in fourth place with one race win (at Mugello) from two starts.

In October 2008, Leimer took part in a three-day Indy Lights prize test with Sam Schmidt Motorsports. The prize test was originally awarded to German driver Michael Ammermüller, but he declined it due to personal reasons.

Leimer continued in the series for 2009, partnering Pål Varhaug, the reigning Italian Formula Renault 2.0 champion. During the first six rounds of the season, he took race wins in Pau, Valencia, Brno, Brands Hatch and Spa-Francorchamps, the latter event supporting the 2009 Belgian Grand Prix. Leimer then sealed the title with his sixth win of the season, at the seventh round in Oschersleben.

GP2 Series

As a result of finishing championship runner-up in the 2008 Formula Master season, in November of that year, Leimer took part in a prize GP2 test with Italian team Trident Racing at the Paul Ricard circuit in France, and a year later he tested with the DAMS team at the same venue as a prize for winning the Formula Master title.

In October 2009, Leimer tested with Tiago Monteiro's Ocean Racing Technology team at Jerez and later that month he was confirmed as a driver for the team in the 2009–10 GP2 Asia Series season, racing alongside fellow Formula Master graduate Alexander Rossi, and former British Formula 3 driver Max Chilton. Leimer continued with the team into the 2010 GP2 Series, and was partnered by Chilton. At the first round of the season in Barcelona, Leimer finished eighth in the feature race, a result which gave him pole position for the reverse grid sprint event which he won from the Rapax Team entry of Luiz Razia. However, he did not score any further points, limiting himself to nineteenth place in the drivers' championship.

For 2011, Leimer moved to the Rapax team alongside Julián Leal. He finished fifth overall in the Asia series, and then proceeded to take his second category win in the main series. As was the case the previous year, the victory came in the sprint race at the Catalunya circuit, and he again set the fastest lap in the process, although on this occasion he owed his reverse-grid pole position to Romain Grosjean's disqualification from the feature race. Another haul of points at Monza saw him improve to 14th position in the championship standings. He also won the feature race of the non-championship event held at the Yas Marina Circuit. Leimer switched to the Racing Engineering team for 2012, where he partnered Nathanaël Berthon. Despite failing to win a race during the season, his improved consistency, consisting of six podium finishes, saw him improve to seventh place in the drivers' championship. Leimer took the GP2 driver's championship title in 2013, with seven podium finishes and three wins.

FIA World Endurance Championship
In 2014, Leimer joined the Swiss team Rebellion Racing for the FIA World Endurance Championship after testing for the team at the pre-season "Prologue". This was Leimer's first experience driving sports cars.

Super Formula
Leimer planned to race at the Japanese Super Formula in 2015, driving a Team Mugen's Honda-powered car. However, on 7 March 2015, it was announced that Leimer's contract with Mugen had been prematurely terminated due to financial issues.

Formula One
On 3 June 2015 the Manor Marussia F1 Team announced that they have signed Leimer as the official team reserve for 2015 and will participate in FP1 sessions at Grand Prix throughout the season. He participated in only one FP1 session, at the Hungarian Grand Prix.

Formula E

On 23 June 2015 Virgin Racing announced Leimer to be their driver to replace Jaime Alguersuari for the final two rounds, 10 and 11, at London after Alguersuari was suspended from racing due to minor health issues. Race 10 saw him qualify 19th and finish the race in 14th position. The final round saw him qualify 17th, but he crashed out of the race. Leimer finished the season without scoring a point and finished 32nd out of 35 in the championship.

Racing record

Career summary

Complete GP2 Series results
(key) (Races in bold indicate pole position) (Races in italics indicate fastest lap)

Complete GP2 Asia Series results
(key) (Races in bold indicate pole position) (Races in italics indicate fastest lap)

Complete GP2 Final results
(key) (Races in bold indicate pole position) (Races in italics indicate fastest lap)

Complete Formula One participations
(key) (Races in bold indicate pole position; races in italics indicate fastest lap)

Complete FIA World Endurance Championship results

24 Hours of Le Mans results

Complete Formula E results
(key) (Races in bold indicate pole position; races in italics indicate fastest lap)

Ferrari Challenge Finali Mondiali results

References

External links
 
 

1989 births
Living people
24 Hours of Le Mans drivers
People from Zofingen District
Swiss racing drivers
International Formula Master drivers
Formula Renault Eurocup drivers
Italian Formula Renault 2.0 drivers
Formula BMW ADAC drivers
GP2 Asia Series drivers
GP2 Series drivers
GP2 Series Champions
FIA World Endurance Championship drivers
Formula E drivers
24H Series drivers
Swiss Formula One drivers
Sportspeople from Aargau
Team Rosberg drivers
Jenzer Motorsport drivers
Ocean Racing Technology drivers
Rapax Team drivers
Racing Engineering drivers
Rebellion Racing drivers
Envision Virgin Racing drivers
Ferrari Challenge drivers